Matt Thompson (born 12 December 1982 in Brighton, England) is a retired rugby union player who last played for Newcastle Falcons in the Aviva Premiership. Thompson plays as a Hooker.

Thompson was a replacement as Newcastle won the 2004 Anglo-Welsh Cup final. He retired in 2014.

References

External links
Newcastle profile
England profile

1982 births
Living people
English rugby union players
Rugby union hookers
Newcastle Falcons players
Rugby union players from Brighton